The City of Mount Gambier is a local government area centred in Mount Gambier in the Limestone Coast region of South Australia. While it is the southernmost city council in the state, the District Council of Grant is the southernmost council because it completely surrounds but does not include the city of Mount Gambier. It was established on 25 May 1876 as the Corporate Town of Mount Gambier, and became the City of Mount Gambier when it gained city status in 1955.

The city consists of a mayor and eight councillors, elected equally from the East and West wards once every four years by postal voting.  In addition to Mount Gambier itself, the council also includes parts of Glenburnie, OB Flat, Suttontown and Worrolong, all shared with the District Council of Grant. Due to the City being entirely surrounded by the District Council of Grant and the growth of Mount Gambier, there have been ongoing talks of amalgamation, with the most recent boundary changes taking place in 2010.

Mayors of Mount Gambier
 Lucas Adolphus DeGaris (1935-1937) 
 William Ewart Pyne (1937-1939) 
 Stanley Charles Davis (1939-1941) 
 William Ewart Pyne (1941-1945) 
 Stanley Charles Davis (1945-1946) 
 William Ewart Pyne (1946-1949) 
 John Hugh Marks (1949-1955) 
 Stanley Charles Davis (1955-1958) 
 John Hugh Marks (1958) 
 Stanley Hamilton Elliott (1959-1964) 
 Lenora Alice Bishop (1964-1967) 
 Stanley Hamilton Elliott (1967-1971) 
 Archibald Llewellyn Sealey (1971-1983) 
 Francis Newman (Don) McDonnell (1983-2002) 
 Steve Perryman (2002-2014) 
 Andrew Lee (2014-2018) 
 Lynette Martin (2018-present)

References 

Limestone Coast
Local government areas of South Australia
Mount Gambier, South Australia